EPS Surface Mining Kosovo is a Serbian coal surface mining company with headquarters in Obilić, Kosovo.

History
EPS Surface Mining Kosovo was founded by Elektroprivreda Srbije (EPS) on 21 December 1991.

Following the Kosovo War and NATO bombing of Yugoslavia in 1999, the UNMIK administration was established in Kosovo on 1 July 1999, and Elektroprivreda Srbije lost its access to the local coal mines and power plants, including Kosovo A and Kosovo B power plants, which were under jurisdiction of EPS Surface Mining Kosovo.

Since then, government-owned Elektroprivreda Srbija by political decision continued to pay off earnings to all of Kosovo-based EPS companies, including EPS Surface Mining Kosovo employees (the other two EPS companies based on Kosovo are EPS TPP Kosovo and EPS Elektrokosmet). However, all these employees are not working in Kosovo-based power plants, and are only occasionally and indirectly employed by EPS throughout the rest of Serbia. As of May 2009, there was a total of around 7,000 such employees which were working only on paper and receive regular earnings. As of June 2017, that number was cut to 4,539 employees.

See also
 Elektroprivreda Srbije
 EPS TPP Kosovo
 EPS Elektrokosmet
 Electrical energy in Kosovo

Notes

References

External links
 Official website

Serbian companies established in 1991
Coal mines in Kosovo
Non-renewable resource companies established in 1991
Energy companies of Kosovo
Elektroprivreda Srbije
Energy companies established in 1991
Government-owned companies of Serbia
1991 establishments in Kosovo